United Petroleum is an Australian petrol retailer and importer.

Its origins can be traced back to 1981, when United's directors commenced operating service stations under the Astron banner in Victoria. Astron was closely associated with Esso. By 1990, the company had opened 23 new sites throughout Victoria.

United Petroleum was established in 1993, with the opening of a chain of service stations/convenience stores in South Australia. It expanded operations into Victoria, and over the next two years built networks in the Australian Capital Territory, New South Wales and Queensland. It later expanded into the Northern Territory, Tasmania and Western Australia.

In the mid 2000s, it acquired fuel import terminals in New South Wales, Northern Territory, Tasmania and Victoria.

In September 2016, United Petroleum filed documents with the Australian Securities & Investments Commission to list the company on the Australian Securities Exchange. However the listing did not proceed, with United becoming involved in a legal dispute with advisors Herbert Smith Freehills.

In April 2017, United Petroleum acquired Pie Face from receivership for an undisclosed sum. 

In 2021 a number of former franchisees sued the company for allegedly unfair termination.

Sponsorships
Between 2014 and 2016, United Petroleum was the official supplier of E85 fuel for the Supercars Championship, after which Shell took over the supply deal.

See also

List of automotive fuel retailers
List of convenience stores

References

External links

Australian companies established in 1993
Automotive fuel retailers in Australia
Companies based in Melbourne
1993 establishments in Australia